is a Japanese footballer who plays for Kawasaki Frontale, as an attacking midfielder.

Club career 
Kozuka was born in Mitsuke, Niigata. He played junior football for Mitsuke FC and Nagaoka Junior Youth FC in the Hokushin'etsu Youth League while attending Mitsuke Minami Junior High School, before being offered a spot at Teikyo Nagaoka High School on a football scholarship.

Kozuka joined Albirex Niigata as an apprentice professional in 2012. He turned full-time professional with Albirex at the start of the 2013 season and made his first-team debut against Tokushima Vortis in the first round of the Nabisco Cup. His first J. League appearance was in the 2–1 away win over Tokushima Vortis on 26 April 2014.

On 8 July 2014, Kozuka joined Japan Football League side Renofa Yamaguchi on loan until December. He scored his first goal for Rnofa against Sony Sendai on 2 August. He became regular for Renofa, creating a strong attacking partnership with Kazuhito Kishida. Kozuka impressed at Renofa, and his loan deal was eventually extended to the end of the 2015 season. On 6 April 2015, in the 3–0 league victory at Fujieda, Kozuka scored a 60-yard goal from the halfway line.

International career 
In April 2012, he was selected in Japan under 18 squad for the TIPOS Slovakia Cup against Norway.

Club statistics
.

Honours

Club
J1 League: 2021

References

External links 
 Profile at Ventforet Kofu
 
 
 
 

1994 births
Living people
Association football people from Niigata Prefecture
Japanese footballers
J1 League players
J2 League players
J3 League players
Albirex Niigata players
Renofa Yamaguchi FC players
J.League U-22 Selection players
Ventforet Kofu players
Oita Trinita players
Association football midfielders